Fetter Schrier Hoblitzell (October 7, 1838 – May 2, 1900) was an American politician and Congressman from Maryland.

Biography
Born in Cumberland, Maryland, Hoblitzell attended the primary schools and graduated from the Allegany Academy of Cumberland.  He studied law, was admitted to the bar in 1859, and commenced practice in Baltimore, Maryland.  During the American Civil War, Hoblitzell served as a private in the First Maryland Regiment of Infantry of the Confederate Army.

After the war, Hoblitzell resumed the practice of law and served as a member of the Maryland House of Delegates in 1870 and 1876.  He was reelected in 1878 and served as speaker of the house.  He was later elected as a Democrat to the Forty-seventh and Forty-eighth Congresses, serving from March 4, 1881, to March 3, 1885.  Afterwards, he served as city counselor of Baltimore in 1888 and 1889, and resumed the practice of law.  He died in Baltimore, and is interred in Loudon Park Cemetery.

References
 Retrieved on 2008-02-14

External links

1838 births
1900 deaths
Speakers of the Maryland House of Delegates
Confederate States Army soldiers
Democratic Party members of the United States House of Representatives from Maryland
Baltimore City Council members
19th-century American politicians
Lawyers from Cumberland, Maryland
Politicians from Cumberland, Maryland